In statistics, semiparametric regression includes regression models that combine parametric  and nonparametric models. They are often used in situations where the fully nonparametric model may not perform well or when the researcher wants to use a parametric model but the functional form with respect to a subset of the regressors or the density of the errors is not known. Semiparametric regression models are a particular type of semiparametric modelling and, since semiparametric models contain a parametric component, they rely on parametric assumptions and may be misspecified and inconsistent, just like a fully parametric model.

Methods 
Many different semiparametric regression methods have been proposed and developed. The most popular methods are the partially linear, index and varying coefficient models.

Partially linear models 
A partially linear model is given by

 

The parametric part of the partially linear model is given by the parameter vector  while the nonparametric part is the unknown function . This type of model was proposed by Robinson (1988) and extended to handle categorical covariates by Racine and Li (2007).

Index models 
A single index model takes the form

 

The single index model takes its name from the parametric part of the model  which is a scalar single index. The nonparametric part is the unknown function .

Ichimura's method 
The single index model method developed by Ichimura (1993) is as follows. Given a known form for the function ,  could be estimated using the nonlinear least squares method to minimize the function

 

For a given value for  an estimate of the function

 

using kernel method. Ichimura (1993) proposes estimating  with

 

Klein and Spady's estimator 
The log-likelihood function is given by

 

where  is the leave-one-out estimator.

Smooth coefficient/varying coefficient models 
Hastie and Tibshirani (1993) propose a smooth coefficient model given by

 

 may be expressed as

See also 
 Nonparametric regression
 Effective degree of freedom

Notes

References 
 
 
 
 
 
 

Nonparametric statistics